Pasang-e Pain (also Romanized as Pāsang-e Pā’īn and Pasang Pā’īn; also known as Sang-e Pā’īn) is a village in Qaravolan Rural District, Loveh District, Galikash County, Golestan Province, Iran. At the 2006 census, its population was 143, in 34 families.

References 

Populated places in Galikash County